are a singing and dancing group under Avex Trax.

They debuted on August 12, 2015, with the song "fire!".

History

Debut 
The group was formed in September 2014 by Avex Trax. Their name comes from the slang word "lol" meaning to "laugh out loud", thus producing their concept of wanting to be a group that makes people smile and can impress people as well.

Their song "Heartbeat" was used as the opening song for the anime "Tribe Cool Crew". Their song "Power of the Dream" was used as the 23rd opening song for the anime "Fairy Tail". Their single, "hikari" is used as the ending theme of Kamen Rider Heisei Generations: Dr. Pac-Man vs. Ex-Aid & Ghost with Legend Rider.

Their fan name is "lol family".

2019: New single with collab 
On June 5, 2019, lol announced the single "Brave Up!!", which was released on July 31, 2019, along with collab of DJ Koo.

Members 
Each member of "lol" was a trainee under "Avex Artist Academy".

Naoto Komiyama  was born on September 18, 1994, in Osaka. He was a member of the boy group "aLoval Boys  WEST". He is the eldest of the group.

Yusuke Satou  was born on June 11, 1996, in Sapporo. He won the Actor Category in "Avex Audition MAX 2013".

Hibiki Kouketsu  (Stage name: Hibiki) was born on August 3, 1997, in Nagoya. She was a contestant as an artist on "Tokyo Girls Audition" 2014.

Honoka Aoki  (Stage name: Honoka) was born on August 26, 1996, in Kyoto. She was a member of another co-ed group ARCUS.

Moka Asada  (Stage name: Moca) was born on February 13, 2001, in Osaka. She was a member of the group LCM+ . She was also a model for "Roni Girls Osaka". She is the youngest member with 7 years age gap to Naoto.

Discography

Anime tracks

Singles

Digital singles

Digital album

Album

References 

Musical groups established in 2014
2014 establishments in Japan
Japanese musical groups